Rahmat Effendi (born 3 February 1964), sometimes nicknamed Pepen, is an Indonesian politician of the Golkar party and the official mayor of Bekasi since 3 May 2012 to 7 January 2022. Previously, he had served as the acting Mayor since 2011 in place of his predecessor who was arrested on corruption charges.

Personal life
Effendi was born in Bekasi on February 3, 1964 as one of six siblings. After graduating from high school, he obtained his Bachelor's (2000) and Master's (2006) in STIA (Sekolah Tinggi Ilmu Administrasi, Higher Institute of Administration) Bagasasi before receiving his Doctorate from Pasundan University in 2010.

He has multiple wives, first being H.G. Guniarti and the second one being Lusiana Oktora. He has 4 children.

Career
Prior to entering politics, Effendi worked as a logistics supervisor in Halliburton Indonesia, and later as a director in a mechanical supply company.

Political career
He was a member of Bekasi's Regional People's Representative Council between 1999 and 2008, and he was its speaker since 2004. He was elected as deputy of Mochtar Mohamad in 2008.

In 2011, Mochtar was arrested and non-activated for investigations of bribery and misuse of city funds. During this period, Effendi served as acting mayor until Mochtar was found guilty and sentenced to 6 years in prison in March 2012. In May, Effendi was elevated to mayor officially.

He ran in the 2013 local elections, and won by securing 43 percent of the vote. Later, his victory was disputed by his rivals over administrative reasons, since he did not register his second wife in the election process. As mayor, Effendi refused to revoke permits to four churches when protested by groups.

He was reelected following the 2018 election, securing 67.5% of the votes. On 5 January 2022, he was arrested by the Corruption Eradication Commission under suspicions of receiving bribery and selling government positions.

References

1964 births
Living people
Indonesian Muslims
Mayors and regents of places in West Java
Members of Bekasi city council
People from Bekasi
Golkar politicians
Mayors of places in Indonesia